Ajaokuta Steel Company Limited (ASCL) popularly known as Ajaokuta Steel Mill is a steel mill in Nigeria, located in Ajaokuta, Kogi State, Nigeria.  Built on a  site starting in 1979, it is the largest steel mill in Nigeria, and the coke oven and byproducts plant are larger than all the refineries in Nigeria combined.  However, the project was mismanaged and remains incomplete 40 years later.  Three-quarters of the complex have been abandoned, and only the light mills have been put into operation for small-scale fabrication and the production of iron rods.

History 

A feasibility study for the production of steel was first awarded to the British, and later undertaken by the Soviet Union under a cooperation agreement with Nigeria.  In 1967, Soviet experts recommended prospecting for iron ore in Nigeria, as the known deposits were of poor quality for steelmaking.  In 1973, iron ore of the required quality was discovered in Itakpe, Ajabanoko, and Oshokoshoko.  The Ajaokuta Steel Company Limited was incorporated in 1979 under President Shehu Shagari who began the project which was 84% completed by the time of his removal from office in 83, and the steel mill reached 98% completion in 1994, with 40 of the 43 plants at the facility having been built.  To supply the Ajaokuta Steel Mill with raw materials and connect it with the world market, a contract was awarded in 1987 for the construction of Nigeria's first standard gauge railway, from the iron mines at Itakpe to the steel mill at Ajaokuta and continuing to the Atlantic Ocean at Warri.

However, both projects have been mismanaged.  The Ajaokuta Steel Mill is still unfinished four decades after construction began.  After several failed attempts at privatisation, the Nigerian government took back control in 2016.  The Ajaokuta Steel Mill still had not produced a single sheet of steel by December 2017.  The light mills were finally put into operation in 2018 for small-scale fabrication and the production of iron rods.  However, three-quarters of the plant have been abandoned, including the large-scale equipment and the internal railway.

The Warri–Itakpe Railway fell into disrepair, and part of the track was vandalised.  In 2016, the Nigerian government awarded contracts to the China Civil Engineering Construction Corporation and Julius Berger to repair and complete the railway. Test runs began in November 2018, and the railway was officially inaugurated by President Muhammadu Buhari on 29 September 2020.

References

External links

Steel companies of Nigeria
Economy of Kogi State
Manufacturing companies established in 1979
Nigeria–Soviet Union relations
Soviet foreign aid
Nigerian companies established in 1979
Unfinished buildings and structures in Nigeria